Tagore University of Creative Arts (TUCA) is a private university located in Dhaka, Bangladesh. The vice-chancellor of the university is Syed Mohammad Shahed.

History 
Tagore University of Creative Arts was established in 2016 by the National Professor Dr. Anisuzzaman who served as the founding president of the board of trustees. Former chairman of UGC Professor Nazrul Islam and icon of Tagore songs Rezwana Choudhury Bannya joined his efforts later. Tagore University of Creative Arts was approved on 7 June 2016 by the Ministry of Education of the Government of Bangladesh.

At present it is being regulated by a Trustee Board consisting of 14 members. Rabin Khan is its secretary and coordinating trustee. Retired professor of the University of Dhaka and former director general of Bangla Academy Dr. Syed Mohammad Shahed was appointed the vice-chancellor on 7 March 2019. On 12 August 2019, the University Grants Commission warned students against joining Tagore University of Creative Arts and 29 other private universities owing to alleged irregularities.

Faculty and department 
At present the university has five departments under three faculties.

Faculty of Service Arts

 Department of Music
 Department of Drama
 Department of Dance

Faculty of Design and Innovation

 Department of Fashion Design

Faculty of Business
 Business administration

Gallery

References

Universities and colleges in Dhaka
Universities of Uttara
Educational institutions established in 2016
2016 establishments in Bangladesh
Private universities in Bangladesh
Memorials to Rabindranath Tagore